() is a rank used by the Russian Ground Forces and a number of former communist states. It is usually equivalent to Warrant officer class 1 or Sergeant major in English speaking armies.

Russia

Soviet Army and Militia
The s were aged volunteers and were expected to have more authority over draftsmen than similarly aged sergeants; they are placed in a separate category of "master non-commissioned officers" ( and ).

Praporshchik ranks of the Russian armed forces from 1994

Insignia

Army

Air Force

See also 
 Ranks and insignia of the Soviet Armed Forces 1955–1991
 Ranks and insignia of the Russian Federation's armed forces 1994–2010
 Army ranks and insignia of the Russian Federation
 Aerospace Forces ranks and insignia of the Russian Federation

References

Military ranks of Russia
Military ranks of Ukraine
Military ranks of the Soviet Union